The GP-5 Sweet Dreams was a Super Sport Class racing airplane designed by George Pereira, owner of Osprey Aircraft.  It was originally built by Gary Childs, who sold it to another builder, who in turn sold it to George Backovich. Backovich enlisted the help of designer Pereira to complete it in 2007, after changes to its automotive engine conversion, and switching the propeller manufacturer. 

The aircraft was specifically built to race in the Unlimited class at the Reno Air Races.  Changes to the Unlimited class rules made the GP-5 no longer eligible for that class, so it was entered in the Sport class instead.  Further rule changes excluded the GP-5 from competing in that class until the Super Sport class emerged. The Super Sport class was merged with the Sport class becoming, effectively, an Unlimited class for aircraft with engines less than  displacement.

Sweet Dreams was entered in the Reno 2010 Sport class, but engine failure during practice runs resulted in the need to find a better engine/propeller/gearbox combination. Eventually the GP-5 competed in the 2012 Sport-Gold class at Reno finishing fourth.

On 8 September 2014, during a qualifying heat at the 2014 Reno Air Races, pilot Lee Behel was killed when Sweet Dreams crashed due to an inflight wing failure.

Specifications (GP-5)

References

External links

Coverage of the crash via kathrynsreport.com – includes NTSB report in much more readable format than official link at faa.gov
GP-5 debut at Reno via eaa.org   (archived copy)
2014 article and 2013 video interview with pilot Lee Behel about the aircraft via avweb.com
Photos of Sweet Dreams via aerialvisuals.ca
Genesis of the GP-5 – EAA Sport Aviation article (may be available to EAA members by searching past issues

GP-5
2000s United States sport aircraft
Single-engined tractor aircraft
Low-wing aircraft
Racing aircraft
Aircraft first flown in 2007